Babylonia spirata, common name the Spiral Babylon, is a species of sea snail, a marine gastropod mollusk, in the family Babyloniidae. It is the type species of the genus Babylonia.

Babylonia spirata is similar in appearance to B. zeylanica, but the whorl of B. spirata has a raised shoulder resulting in a sort of channel around the spire.

References

spirata
Gastropods described in 1758
Taxa named by Carl Linnaeus